The Franconian Circle was an Imperial Circle established in 1500 in the centre of the Holy Roman Empire. It comprised the eastern part of the former Franconian stem duchy—roughly corresponding with the present-day Bavarian Regierungsbezirke of Upper, Middle and Lower Franconia—while western Rhenish Franconia belonged to the Upper Rhenish Circle. The title of a "Duke of Franconia" was claimed by the Würzburg bishops.

Emergence and location 
As early as the Middle Ages, Franconia had very close links to king and empire. Located between the Rhenish territories of the empire and the Kingdom of Bohemia, Franconia, which included the former Duchy of Franconia, had been one of the centres of empire for a long time.

By order of Emperor Louis of Bavaria, Bamberg, Würzburg, Eichstätt and Fulda with the Hohenzollern Burgraves of Nuremberg, Counts of Henneberg, the Castell and Hohenlohe, the three episcopal cities, and the imperial cities of Nuremberg and Rothenburg united for the first time in a Landfrieden union. But this union (the Franconian Landfrieden) did not last long; it disintegrated in the face of opposition from cities and princes.

On 2 July 1500, at the Reichstag of Augsburg, the Holy Roman Empire of the German Nation was divided into six imperial circles. These first circles were originally numbered, the Franconian Imperial Circle being given the number 1:

The circles were later given names that corresponded to their geographical location, which gave rise to the name Franconian Imperial Circle, which appeared for the first time in 1522. In the late Middle Ages, Franconia was understood to mean the area between the forested uplands of the Spessart and the Steigerwald, mainly comprising the estates of the Bishopric of Würzburg.

The imperial circle extended from the Franconian Saale river to the Altmühl river and encompassed most of the upper and middle reaches of the River Main, roughly corresponding to the modern Bavarian provinces of Upper, Middle and Lower Franconia, but without the Electoral Mainz estates of the Upper Stift around Aschaffenburg.

Using the name Franconia, created an awareness of an inner unity and with an increased sense of togetherness and solidarity which, however, did not exist in the political or sovereign arenas.

Composition 
The circle was made up of the following states:

See also 
 Flag of Franconia
 History of Franconia

References

Sources 
 The list of states making up the Franconian Circle is based on that in the German Wikipedia article Fränkischer Reichskreis.

External links 
 Imperial Circles in the 16th Century – Historical Maps of Germany

 
Circles of the Holy Roman Empire
History of Franconia
1500s establishments in the Holy Roman Empire
1500 establishments in Europe